Aiteta thermistis is a moth in the family of Nolidae.

Distribution
It is found in Zambia.

References

Hampson, G. F. 1910c. Zoological collections from Northern Rhodesia and adjacent territories: Lepidoptera Phalaenae - Proceedings of the Zoological Society of London 1910(2):388–510, pls. 36–41

Endemic fauna of Zambia
Chloephorinae